This is the discography of Turkish pop singer Candan Erçetin. She has released 9 studio albums, 2 remix albums, 2 remix EP's and six singles.

Albums

Remix EP's

Remix albums

Singles
 "Unut Sevme" (2001) - Limited edition single
 "Kim Korkar" (2018)
 "Değişiyoruz" (2018)
 "Bekle" (2018) - with Kardeş Türküler
 "Annem" (2019) (Remix of the song from Elbette, with additional verses, for the movie Annem)
 "İyi ki" (2020)
 "Teselli" (2021) (Remix of the song from Çapkın)

Guest appearances

Compilation albums
This list shows Candan Erçetin songs that are re-used in a compilation album.

Other songs

References

External links 
Candan Erçetin's official website

Discographies of Turkish artists
Pop music discographies